Judendorf-Straßengel is a former municipality in the district of Graz-Umgebung in the Austrian state of Styria. Since the 2015 Styria municipal structural reform, it is part of the municipality Gratwein-Straßengel.

Geography
The town is located a few kilometres north of Graz on the right bank of the Mur river.

History
The town was first mentioned in the year AD 860 as Strazinolum.

Sights
The fourteenth century Gothic Pilgrimage Church Maria Straßengel that stands on a hill overlooking the town was constructed between 1346 and 1355, and contains an important high altar.

Economy
The town also has a rehab clinic, a chemical plant, and a punching tool factory.

Tourism
Straßengel attracts 23,774 overnight stays in tourism. Plankenwarth Castle is located nearby.

References

Cities and towns in Graz-Umgebung District